Josiah Wedgwood may refer to any of the following British potters and entrepreneurs:

 Josiah Wedgwood I (1730–1795), Founder of the pottery firm
 Josiah Wedgwood II (1769–1843), son of the first Josiah Wedgwood, head of the firm
 Josiah Wedgwood III (1795–1880), son of the second Josiah Wedgwood
 Josiah Wedgwood, 1st Baron Wedgwood (Josiah Wedgwood IV, 1872–1943), great-grandson of the second Josiah Wedgwood, great nephew of the third Josiah Wedgwood. Politician
 Josiah Wedgwood V (1899–1968), son of the fourth Josiah Wedgwood, last Wedgwood to head the pottery firm. Father of the sixth Josiah Wedgwood (a doctor in Washington state) 
 Josiah F. Wedgwood (Josiah Wedgwood VII, 1950–2009), son of the sixth Josiah Wedgwood, doctor in Massachusetts and husband of Ruth Wedgwood, a university law professor